Kite Stream is a meltwater stream in the Victoria Valley, Victoria Land, Antarctica, that flows west from Victoria Lower Glacier into Lake Vida. It was named by the Advisory Committee on Antarctic Names after James Steven Kite of the University of Maine, who was a geological field assistant with the Victoria Valley party, 1977–78.

References

Rivers of Victoria Land
McMurdo Dry Valleys